Rolando Antonio Algandona Tejada (born 12 April 1989 in Panama City) is a Panamanian football defender who currently plays for Árabe Unido.

Club career
Algandona started his career at San Francisco and in summer 2012 he joined Sporting San Miguelito only to return to San Francisco in January 2014.

International career
He made his senior debut for Panama on March 13, 2009 against Trinidad & Tobago and has, as of 1 May 2015, earned a total of 10 caps, scoring no goals. He represented his country in 1 FIFA World Cup qualification match.

Honors

Club
Liga Panameña de Fútbol (2):
2007 (A), 2008 (A)

References

External links

1989 births
Living people
Sportspeople from Panama City
Association football defenders
Panamanian footballers
Panama international footballers
San Francisco F.C. players
Sporting San Miguelito players